The Holocaust (Return of Cultural Objects) Act 2009 (c 16) is an Act of the Parliament of the United Kingdom. Its purpose is to confer, on certain national institutions, a power that was already possessed by other museums to return to their rightful owners cultural objects unlawfully acquired during the Nazi era. It was introduced into Parliament as the Holocaust (Stolen Art) Restitution Bill. The Bill was amended to give it a different name.

Sections 1 to 3
These sections came into force on 13 January 2010.

Section 1 provides that the Act applies to: 
The Board of Trustees of the Armouries
The British Library Board
The Trustees of the British Museum
The Trustees of the Imperial War Museum
The Board of Trustees for the National Galleries of Scotland
The Board of Trustees of the National Gallery
The Trustees of the National Library of Scotland
The Trustees of the National Maritime Museum
The Board of Trustees of the National Museums and Galleries on Merseyside
The Board of Trustees of the National Museums of Scotland
The Board of Trustees of the National Portrait Gallery
The Trustees of the Natural History Museum
The Board of Trustees of the Royal Botanic Gardens, Kew
The Board of Trustees of the Science Museum
The Board of Trustees of the Tate Gallery
The Board of Trustees of the Victoria and Albert Museum
The Board of Trustees of the Wallace Collection

Section 2 authorises those bodies to transfer objects from their collections if the Advisory Panel has recommended that transfer and the Secretary of State has approved that recommendation. (The bodies in question were previously prohibited by statute from doing this).

Section 3 defines the expression "Advisory Panel". The explanatory notes to the Act said that the Government intended to designate the Spoliation Advisory Panel as the Advisory Panel for the purpose of this Act. That body, created in 2000 as a non-departmental public body under the Department for Culture, Media and Sport, retained its designation under the 2009 Act after it was reconstituted in April 2010 as an expert group (under the same name).

Section 4 - Short title, extent, commencement and sunset

This section came into force on 12 November 2009.

Section 4(1) authorises the citation of this Act by a short title.

Section 4(3) confers a power on the Secretary of State to appoint the day on which sections 1 to 3 of the Act come into force. This power was fully exercised by the Holocaust (Return of Cultural Objects) Act 2009 (Commencement) Order 2010 (S.I. 2010/50 (C.8)).

Section 4(7) was a sunset clause. It provided that the Act would have expired at the end of the period of ten years which began on the day it was passed. This clause was repealed under the Holocaust (Return of Cultural Objects) (Amendment) Act 2019.

Application of the Holocaust (Return of Cutlural Objects) Act 2009 
Since the implementation of the Holocaust Act, the Advisory Panel has considered twenty-two claims for the restitution of artefacts and objects. Despite the numerous Advisory Panel's recommendations, the act has only been successfully applied once. This is because the Advisory Panel is a non-binding institution and museums do not have to follow their recommendations. The details of these claims can be seen in the following table :

References
Halsbury's Statutes,

External links
The Holocaust (Return of Cultural Objects) Act 2009, as amended from the National Archives.
The Holocaust (Return of Cultural Objects) Act 2009, as originally enacted from the National Archives.
Explanatory notes to the Holocaust (Return of Cultural Objects) Act 2009.

Cultural heritage of the United Kingdom
United Kingdom Acts of Parliament 2009
The Holocaust and the United Kingdom
Art and cultural repatriation after World War II